Ghost in the Machine or Ghosts in the Machine may refer to:
 Ghost in the machine, a philosophical term introduced by Gilbert Ryle in his 1949 book The Concept of Mind

Film and television
 Ghost in the Machine (film), a 1993 horror and science fiction film starring Karen Allen
 "Ghost in the Machine" (The 4400), an episode of The 4400
 "Ghost in the Machines", an episode of Futurama
 "Ghost in the Machine" (Stargate Atlantis) an episode of Stargate Atlantis
 "Ghost in the Machine" (The X-Files), an episode of The X-Files
 "The Ghost in the Machine", an episode of Bones
 "Ghosts in the Machine", an episode of Caprica
 "Ghost in the Machine", an episode of CSI Cyber
 "Ghost in the Machine", a two-part episode of Degrassi: The Next Generation
 "The Ghost in the Machine", an episode of Falling Skies
 "Ghost in the Machine", an episode of The Flash
 "Ghost in the Machine", an episode of Ghost Whisperer
 "Ghost in the Machine", an episode of Inspector Morse
 "Ghost in the Machine", an episode of Kyle XY
 "Ghost in the Machine", an episode of Superman: The Animated Series
 "Ghost in the Machine", an episode of The Transformers
 "Ghost in the Machine", an episode of Father Brown (2013 TV series)
 "The Machine in the Ghost". a short of Star Wars Rebels

Literature
 The Ghost in the Machine, a 1967 book by Arthur Koestler
 Ghost in the Machine (novel), a 2009 children's supernatural mystery novel by Patrick Carman
 A Ghost in the Machine, a 2004 mystery novel by Caroline Graham

Music

Albums
 Ghost in the Machine (album), a 1981 album by The Police
 Ghosts in the Machine, a 2006 album by Switched
 Ghost in the Machine, a 1999 album by Eternal Decision

Songs
 "Ghost in the Machine" (song), a song by SZA from the album SOS (2022), featuring Phoebe Bridgers
 "Ghost in the Machine", a song by Blaze from Silicon Messiah
 "Ghost in the Machine", a song by B.o.B from B.o.B Presents: The Adventures of Bobby Ray
 "Ghost in the Machine", a 2015 song by Blasterjaxx & MOTi, featuring Jonathan Mendelsohn
 "Ghost in the Machine", a song by Ghost Town (feat. Chris Shelley)
 "Ghost in the Machine", a song by ELLA

Orchestral music
 The Ghost in the Machine, a 1990 composition by John Woolrich

Other uses
 Ghost in the Machine (artwork), a 1983 work by Linda Nishio

See also
 Ghost in the Shell (disambiguation)
 Ghost Machine (disambiguation)